Mirl Arthur "Red" McCarthy (March 12, 1930 – 1995), was a Canadian sportsperson, sport and recreation administrator, ice hockey player, founder and co-inventor of the sport of ringette, and for a time, a professional skating star and barrel jumper.

Biography

Born in Sturgeon Falls, Ontario and raised in Sudbury, he grew up to be a star athlete in baseball, football, track and field, and ice hockey. His hockey career included stops with Toronto St. Michael's College, Barrie Flyers, Boston Olympics, Nelson B.C. Maple Leafs, Sudbury Caruso Miners, and Sudbury Wolves of the Canadian Senior Hockey League. McCarthy played in three ice hockey leagues over the course of his career: the Ontario Hockey League, the Eastern Amateur Hockey League, and the Northern Ontario Hockey Association. 

At the Chicago World's Fair, in Chicago, Illinois, United States, McCarthy was photographed participating in barrel jumping, a discipline of speed skating, at the Black Forest Village.

In 1954, at the age of 24, he became recreation director of Espanola, Ontario and held the position for forty-one years. He became actively involved in all aspects of Espanola's recreational programs and was instrumental in forming the Northern Ontario Hockey Association (NOHA) Junior A Hockey League, and the Espanola Eagles Junior A hockey team. He coached the team for 18 years, and then managed it for four more.

The Red McCarthy Memorial Trophy is the Northern Ontario Junior Hockey League's award given annually to the "Coach of the Year".

Ringette

McCarthy, a member of the Northern Ontario Recreation Directors Association (NORDA), set up the first on-ice activity, or "game", of ringette which took place at the Espanola Arena in the fall of 1963. He drew up the first set of rules and set up the very first game between Espanola high school girls who had played high school ice hockey.

McCarthy had been present at a meeting when Sam Jacks brought up the fact that there was a need for a new winter team sport for girls. After Jacks's presentation, McCarthy volunteered to experiment with the new sport in Espanola where he was the recreation director and arena manager. Equipped with Jack's basic idea, McCarthy then created the first set of rules for the sport of ringette. These rules were then presented at a NORDA meeting at Moose Lake Lodge in Onaping, Ontario, on January 19–20, 1964. Today the title of "birthplace of ringette" is shared by both North Bay, Ontario, and Espanola, Ontario, though Espanola is still recognized as the "Official Home of Ringette". To date, McCarthy has not had a trophy or any other award in the sport named in his honour.

Honours
 Ringette Canada Hall of Fame - Founder (Inducted 1988)
 Sudbury Sport Hall of Fame (2007, inducted posthumously)
 Mirl "Red" McCarthy Memorial Trophy - awarded to top Coach in Northern Ontario Junior Hockey League
 Recreational Director of Espanola, Ontario for 41 years.
 Athletic complex in Espanola named the "Red McCarthy Memorial Athletic Fields".
 Ringette is one of four sports featured on the "Canadian Inventions: Sports" series issued by Canada Post stamps on August 10, 2009.

See also 
Sam Jacks
Ringette
Ringette in Canada

Further reading
 Collins, Kenneth Stewart (2004). The Ring Starts Here: An Illustrated History of Ringette. 
 Hall, Margaret Ann (2016). The Girl and the Game: A History of Women's Sport in Canada. University of Toronto Press.
 Hall, Margaret Ann; Pfister, Gertrud. Honoring the Legacy: Fifty Years of the International Association of Physical Education and Sport for Girls and Women.

References

External links
 

Ringette
20th-century Canadian inventors
1930 births
1995 deaths
Sportspeople from Greater Sudbury
Creators of sports